Savoir Flair is a digital women’s fashion, beauty, and culture magazine based in Dubai, UAE. It was founded in June 2009 by Haleh Nia, who is the magazine’s current Publisher and editor-in-chief. Savoir Flair’s mission as the region's first digital title is to “showcase the inspirational faces, places and spaces of the Middle East”, while also reporting on international trends and contextualizing them according to the culture of the region.

History 
When Haleh Nia launched the company at the age of 24, she was, at the time, the youngest publisher and editor-in-chief in the Middle East. Nia is considered to be an influential fashion publisher and digital innovator in the region, and she has been consulted for her expertise by industry resources like Business of Fashion and Buro 24/7. Nia chaired the discussion “The State of the Industry: Where Do We Go From Here?” at Fashion Forward Season 4 and moderated a panel discussion with Symphony featuring Anna Dello Russo in November 2011. At the 2014 Arab Luxury World Conference, she moderated a panel on the rising fashion and accessories market in the Middle East.

Savoir Flair launched a new version of its website in October 2015, working with London-based agency Code and Theory. In May 2016, Savoir Flair launched an Arabic-language sister website, Savoir Flair Al Arabiya, with a photo-shoot and interview with Arab singing sensation Nancy Ajram. In early 2017, both titles were incorporated under the Halo Media umbrella, a 360-degree media company comprising publishing and a creative agency called Halo Studio which produces white-label content.

In June 2019, the magazine announced the launch of a coffee-table book in celebration of its tenth anniversary. The book, titled SFX, will be published by Assouline and released globally in late 2020.

References 

Fashion magazines